Limerick City Gallery of Art (LCGA) is an art museum in the city of Limerick, Ireland. It is run by Limerick City Council and is located in Pery Square, in the Newtown Pery area of the city.

The gallery is housed in a Romanesque Revival building which was constructed in 1906 as a Carnegie library and museum.  The Limerick City Collection of Art was established in 1936; it has since taken over the Carnegie building and expanded into a purpose-built extension.

The permanent collection includes 18th, 19th, and 20th century Irish artworks. The gallery also holds regular temporary exhibitions of contemporary works, and has been one of the primary venues for EVA International, the Irish biennial of contemporary art.

See also 
 Hunt Museum
 Limerick City Museum
 List of museums in the Republic of Ireland

References

External links 
 Limerick City Gallery of Art website

Library buildings completed in 1906
Romanesque Revival architecture in Ireland
Carnegie libraries in Ireland
Former library buildings
Museums in County Limerick
Local museums in the Republic of Ireland
Art museums and galleries in the Republic of Ireland
Education in Limerick (city)
Art museums established in 1936
1906 establishments in Ireland
Buildings and structures in Limerick (city)
Art galleries established in 1936
20th-century architecture in the Republic of Ireland